Anticla limosa is a moth in the Bombycidae family. It was described by Schaus in 1892. It is found in the Neotropical realm.

References

Natural History Museum Lepidoptera generic names catalog

Bombycidae
Moths described in 1892